Bernard Tomic was the defending champion, but lost in the final to Juan Martín del Potro, 3–6, 1–6.

Seeds

Draw

Finals

Top half

Bottom half

Qualifying

Seeds

 Mikhail Kukushkin (first round)
 Teymuraz Gabashvili (first round)
 Benjamin Becker (first round)
 Andrey Golubev (second round)
 Albert Ramos (qualifying competition, lucky loser)
 Kenny de Schepper (first round)
 Jiří Veselý (qualifying competition)
 Alex Bogomolov Jr. (qualifying competition)

Qualifiers

Lucky loser
  Albert Ramos

Qualifying draw

First qualifier

Second qualifier

Third qualifier

Fourth qualifier

References
 Main Draw
 Qualifying Draw

M